Heping Street Subdistrict is a subdistrict on the northwestern side of Chaoyang District, Beijing, China. As of 2020, it has a total population of 81,180.

It was named after Heping Street that was located within it.

History 
Heping Street Subdistrict was established in 1956, when Xiaohuangzhuang and Wuluju Townships merged into Dongjiaoqu Wuluju Office, later changed to the current name in 1990.

Administrative Division 
As of 2021, the subdistrict has a total of 12 communities within its borders:

Landmark 

 China Academy of Building Research

References 

Chaoyang District, Beijing
Subdistricts of Beijing